Jezero  is a crater on Mars in the Syrtis Major quadrangle, about  in diameter. Thought to have once been flooded with water, the crater contains a fan-delta deposit rich in clays. The lake in the crater was present when valley networks were forming on Mars. Besides having a delta, the crater shows point bars and inverted channels. From a study of the delta and channels, it was concluded that the lake inside the crater probably formed during a period in which there was continual surface runoff.

In 2007, following the discovery of its ancient lake, the crater was named after Jezero, Bosnia and Herzegovina, one of several eponymous towns in the country. In some Slavic languages, the word  means 'lake'.

In November 2018, it was announced that Jezero had been chosen as the landing site for the rover Perseverance as part of NASA's Mars 2020 mission. In November 2020, evidence of boulder falls was found on the slopes of the delta deposits that the rover is planned to explore, on the wall of Jezero itself as well as on the wall of Dacono, a small crater  in diameter on the floor of Jezero. Perseverance successfully landed in the crater on 18 February 2021.  On 5 March 2021, NASA named the landing site of the rover Octavia E. Butler Landing.

Local features
 Séítah (pronounced //, meaning 'amidst the sand' in Navajo) — potentially the oldest, accessible geologic units in Jezero Crater with multiple outcrops between the numerous sand ripples; location where Perseverance started the first year of its scientific campaign and took the first core samples.

In December 2021, NASA announced that some of the rocks in Jezero in Seitah were igneous.  When examined closely, rocks revealed the mineral olivine surrounded by the mineral pyroxene.  That arrangement happens in thick magma bodies and geologists call this type of texture "Cumulate."   Carbonate and sulfate minerals were also detected which means that the rocks had been altered by water.  The instrument used for this analysis was the Planetary Instrument for X-ray Lithochemistry (PIXL).

Crater

In a March 2015 paper, researchers from Brown University described how an ancient Martian lake system existed in Jezero. The study advanced the idea that water filled the crater at least two separate times. There are two channels on the northern and western sides of the crater that probably supplied it with water; each of these channels has a delta-like deposit where sediment was carried by water and deposited in the lake. Craters of a given diameter are expected to have a certain depth; a depth less than expected means sediment entered the crater. Most of the sediments may have been brought in by channels.

Since it is believed that the lake was long-lived, life may have developed in the crater; the delta may have required a period of one to ten million years to form. Clay minerals have been detected in and around the crater. The Mars Reconnaissance Orbiter identified smectite clays. Clays form in the presence of water, so this area probably once held water and maybe life in ancient times. The surface in places is cracked into polygonal patterns; such shapes often form when clay dries out. The image below depicts examples of these patterns, and a channel that carried water and sediments into the crater.

Exploration

Mars 2020 mission

Jezero, once considered a site for the Mars Science Laboratory, was later proposed as a landing site for NASA's Mars 2020 mission, carrying the rover Perseverance and the helicopter Ingenuity. In early 2017 it was selected as one of the top three candidate landing sites, along with northeast Syrtis,  to the southwest.

A primary aim of the Mars 2020 mission is to search for signs of ancient life. It is hoped that a later mission could then return Martian samples from sites identified as probably containing remains of life. Geologists hope to examine places where water once ponded. They would like to examine sediment layers.

In November 2018, Jezero was selected as the target landing site for Mars 2020. On 18 February 2021, Perseverance landed successfully in the crater. On 19 April 2021, Ingenuity performed the first powered flight on Mars from Jezero, which received the commemorative ICAO airport code JZRO.

Mars Sample Retrieval Lander

An ESA–NASA team produced a three-launch architecture concept for a Mars sample return, which uses the Mars 2020 rover to cache small samples, a two-stage, solid-fueled 
Mars ascent stage to send it into orbit, and an orbiter to rendezvous with it above Mars and take it to Earth. Solar-electric propulsion could allow a one launch sample return instead of three. So, after a launch in July 2026, a lander with a  Mars ascent rocket (developed by NASA) with two sample recovery helicopters lands exactly near the Mars 2020 rover at Three Forks in Jezero Crater in August 2028. The collected samples by Mars 2020 are delivers them to the ascent rocket. Once loaded with the samples, the Mars ascent rocket will launch with the sample return canister in spring 2029 and reach a low Mars orbit.

This design would ease the schedule of the whole project, giving controllers time and flexibility to carry out the required operations. Furthermore, the program could rely on the successful landing system developed for the Mars Science Laboratory, avoiding the costs and risks associated with developing and testing yet another landing system from scratch. In addition, NASA may change the solar panels on lander with Radioisotope Thermoelectric Generator, a nuclear power source, to ensure sufficient power and to keep the rocket’s propulsion system from getting too cold, thus ensuring a longer lifetime, better thermal protection and safe operation even if they are carried in Mars Global Dust Storm Season, but these changes are still to be clarified by NASA.

In 2022, the Perseverance Rover detected organic molecules in the crater.

Interactive Mars map

Gallery

See also

 
 
 
 
 
 
 
 
 List of craters on Mars

Notes

References

Further reading

External links
 Jezero Crater – DataSheet (14 January 2017)
 Jezero Crater – Workshop Images/Details (4 August 2015)
 Perseverance rover: Official website
 Mars 2020: Official website
 Mars 2020: Location Maps
 Video – FlyOver bw (01:20) and color (02:20) (SDoran; 21 April 2017) 
 Video – Mars 2020 Site News (01:00) (NASA; 19 November 2018)
 Video – Mars 2020 Site News (00:50) (MSN; 19 November 2018)
 Video – Mars 2020: Jezero crater flyover (02:13) (NASA; 13 December 2018)
  (NASA; 18 February 2021)
 Video (60:00) - Minerals and the Origins of Life - (Robert Hazen; NASA; April 2014)
 Video (86:49) - Search for Life in the Universe - (NASA; July 2014)

Impact craters on Mars
Mars 2020
Syrtis Major quadrangle